Mafalda Margarethe Prinzessin und Landgräfin von Hessen (born 6 July 1965), known also as Princess Mafalda of Hesse, is a German aristocrat and fashion designer. She is the eldest child of Moritz, Landgrave of Hesse and Princess Tatiana of Sayn-Wittgenstein-Berleburg.

Fashion career
Mafalda von Hessen studied at New York University and has a master's degree in design. After graduating, she worked for the Roman costume house Tirelli and the designer Patrick Kinmonth. She has also served as a style ambassador for Giorgio Armani. In autumn 2015, she released her latest collection.

She was named in Vanity Fairs 2007 International Best-Dressed List.

Marriages and children
Mafalda first married Count Enrico Marone Cinzano on 8 July 1989, but they divorced soon after. The marriage was childless.

Second, she married Carlo Galdo on 19 December 1991. They have two children. The couple divorced in 1999.

Third, Mafalda married Count Ferdinando Brachetti Peretti on 14 July 2000. They have two children. They were divorced in 2014.

Ancestry

References

External links
Mafalda von Hessen photostream at Zimbio

1965 births
Living people
German fashion designers
German women fashion designers
Mafalda
Mafalda